Niglkande Rural LLG is a local-level government (LLG) of Chimbu Province, Papua New Guinea.

Wards
01. Kewandeku/Mainagl
02. Girai Tamagle/Anga
03. Girai Tamagle
04. Nunuiomane 1
05. Nunuiomane 2
06. Kewandeku/Dugpag
07. Kengaglku/Kalaku 1
08. Kengaglku/Kalaku 2
09. Kombri 2
10. Gandenkoraglku
11. Koromba Barengigl
12. Kengaglku/Kruglku
13. Girai Tamage

References

Local-level governments of Chimbu Province